Mini-MunchMan is a handheld electronic game that was released in 1981 in the UK by the manufacturer Grandstand. The game is a rebadged version of Epoch-Man from Epoch.

In some markets, such as Australia, the game was badged "Mini-Arcade".

Overview
Capitalising on the then-contemporary success of Namcos Pac-Man, the game was released in the same year as Grandstand's larger Munchman game and in the same yellow colour scheme (Conversely, Epoch Man is white). Mini-Munchman, however, is a pocket-sized device that includes additional features, such as a real-time clock, alarm, and stopwatch. The manufacturer later spawned a larger LCD version with greater screen area called Pocket Pac-Man.

Hardware
The game employs a low consumption LCD-based screen, allowing for a small form factor design incorporating alkaline button power cells. The game requires two LR-44 or equivalent cells. In-game objects are displayed on fixed, immovable LCD elements. The main score display, which doubles up as a date/time and stopwatch display, consists of a three-and-a-half-digit display and an extra small digit for tenths of a second, or lives remaining.
Gameplay

The object of the game is to move the character around a maze, eat all the fruit, and avoid contact with ghosts. There are two humpback bridges containing fruit items over and underneath the bridge. Each successive level is faster, increasing difficulty. Each level has a fixed route the player can follow to ensure completion without losing a life. The game tracks the player's score, with a maximum possible score of 1,999. Once this has been exceeded, the score will display as HHH'.

References

1981 video games
Pac-Man clones
Handheld electronic games
Video games about food and drink
Video games developed in the United Kingdom
1980s toys